The Vânători were a light infantry unit of the Romanian Army established on 1 July 1860. Compared to the regular infantry units, the Vânători specialized in close combat and high-precision firing on enemy positions, ambush actions, and had greater mobility on the field. In addition, the Vânători units also carried out protocol missions and guarded the royal and princely residences in Bucharest, Cotroceni, and Peleș, as well as the headquarters of the Ministry of War.

History
After the election of Alexandru Ioan Cuza and the Unification of Moldavia and Wallachia, the armies of the two Principalities were reorganized. The rapid homogenization of the military forces of Moldavia and Wallachia led to the merging of the two armies into the new Romanian Army.

One of the first units to be established was the 1st Tirailleur Battalion (Batalionul 1 Tiraliori), on 1 July 1860. Soon after, the battalion was renamed to the 1st Vânători Battalion (Batalionul 1 de Vânători), which was closer to Romanian military traditions. The battalion had eight companies of 100 soldiers. The uniform of the Vânători Battalion was inspired by that of the Italian Bersaglieri. The battalion was led by Major Dimitrie Lecca and it took part in the forced abdication of Alexandru Ioan Cuza. Following Cuza's abdication, in 1866, three more battalions were formed with a similar organization to the 1st Battalion. Over time, the ceremonial role of the Vânători was taken by the 2nd Battalion. The Battalion was also given the honorific name "Regina Elisabeta" by King Carol I.

Romanian War of Independence

During the Romanian War of Independence of 1877, the Vânători battalions participated in the Siege of Plevna. The 2nd Battalion in particular, distinguished itself in taking the Grivița 1 redoubt, together with the 14th Dorobanți Regiment. During the battle, three Ottoman cannons and a battle flag were captured.

The soldiers of the Vânători battalions were equipped with Peabody rifles and bayonets, similar to regular infantry equipment. The soldiers had two cartridge boxes, one carried in front and the other in the back. The one in the back was used only in the campaign. All leather equipment was colored black. Besides rifles, the battalions also had two types of machine guns in their endowment. Two Christophe-Montigny machine guns were purchased from Austria-Hungary in 1872, and assigned to the 1st and 2nd Battalions, while in 1873 and 1875, two Gatling guns were purchased and entered service with the 3rd and 4th Battalions. Of the four battalions, however, only the 2nd Battalion is known to have used its machine gun during the campaign.

World War I
Following the reorganization of 1888, each division of the Romanian Army had a battalion of Vânători. In total, there were 10 battalions, numbered 1 to 10 in reference to the infantry division they were assigned to. When the mobilization for the war started, the battalions were converted to regiments. In January 1918, the 10 regiments were merged in two divisions. The 1st, 2nd, 5th, 6th, and 9th Vânători Regiments together with the 31st Artillery Regiment formed the 1st Vânători Division, while the 3rd, 4th, 7th, 8th, and 10th Vânători Regiments together with the 32nd Artillery Regiment formed the 2st Vânători Division. The two Divisions participated in the post-war military actions and in the Hungarian–Romanian War in 1919.<ref>{{cite book|author-link=Gheorghe Mărdărescu|last=Mărdărescu|first=Gheorghe D.|title= Campania pentru desrobirea Ardealului și ocuparea Budapestei (1918–1920)|publisher= Cartea Românească S.A.|location= București|year=1922|page=12}}</ref>

In 1931, King Carol II established the title of "guard" units, which was given to elite units tasked with ensuring the protection of great importance areas, such as the Royal Palace. The 2nd Vânători Regiment received this title, and its battle flag was also decorated with the Order of Michael the Brave 2nd Class.

Following the end of the Second World War, and the abdication of King Michael I, the Vânători'' units were disbanded.

See also
Bersaglieri
Chasseurs
Jägers
Vânători de munte

References 

Romanian Army units
Infantry units and formations
Military units and formations established in 1860